Robert Ellenstein (June 18, 1923 – October 28, 2010) was an American actor. The son of Meyer C. Ellenstein, a Newark dentist, Ellenstein grew up to see his father become a two-term mayor from 1933 to 1941. He served in the United States Army Air Forces during World War II: earning a Purple Heart during his service.

Film and television career
A veteran of the "Golden Age" of live television (he played Quasimodo in a live Robert Montgomery Presents (1950) version of "The Hunchback of Notre Dame"), for the same show played the lead in "A Case of Identity", later turned into the film The Wrong Man (1956), he was the first actor to play Albert Einstein on television. Ellenstein made his first film in 1954 (MGM's Rogue Cop), he was featured in Alfred Hitchcock's North by Northwest. In 1961, he played the mobster Legs Diamond in an episode of NBC's 1920s crime drama The Lawless Years with James Gregory.

Among his television appearances, Ellenstein guest starred in three episodes of Perry Mason.  In 1957 he played defendant John Addison in "The Case of the Vagabond Vixen."  In 1959 he played murder victim Arthur Cartright in "The Case of the Howling Dog," and in 1960 he played Medical Examiner Dr. McBride in "The Case of the Madcap Modiste." In 1965 he played a character curiously of 65 years of age (in obviously inadequate makeup) in a second season episode of The Man From U.N.C.L.E. He appeared in two episodes of the WWII drama, Combat!, first in 1965 in "The Tree of Moray" and in 1966 he was in the episode "Counterplay". He also made three guest appearances on The Untouchables, five appearances on The Wild Wild West, four on Ironside, and five on Mission: Impossible. He also directed television with an episode of the 1960s sitcom, Love on a Rooftop, and many live television episodes.

Ellenstein had over 200 television appearances. He performed hundreds of stage roles as an actor. He directed many theatre productions in New York, Los Angeles and in regional theater. He was artistic director of The Company of Angels and Founding Artistic Director of the Los Angeles Repertory Company.

Death
Ellenstein died in Los Angeles of natural causes on October 28, 2010 at age 87.

Filmography

References

External links 
 
 

1923 births
2010 deaths
Male actors from Newark, New Jersey
American male film actors
American male stage actors
American male television actors
United States Army Air Forces personnel of World War II